VAB may refer to:

Vehicle Assembly Building, a large building at NASA's Kennedy Space Center where space vehicles are prepared for launch
Véhicule de l'Avant Blindé, a French wheeled armored personnel carrier
Vacuum-assisted breast biopsy, a minimally invasive procedure
Visual Arts Board, historic board of the Australia Council

See also
Vabs (disambiguation)